Andrzej Kłopotowski (9 August 1935 – 12 February 2011) was a Polish breaststroke swimmer. He competed in the men's 200 metre breaststroke at the 1960 Summer Olympics.

References

External links
 

1935 births
2011 deaths
Polish male breaststroke swimmers
Olympic swimmers of Poland
Swimmers at the 1960 Summer Olympics
Swimmers from Warsaw
Universiade medalists in swimming
Universiade bronze medalists for Poland
20th-century Polish people